Fora Islet (Portuguese:  ("outer islet")) is an uninhabited Portuguese island in the Atlantic Ocean, forming part of the Savage Islands, a dependant archipelago of the autonomous region of Madeira.

It lies about 300 kilometres from Madeira and 160 kilometres north of the Canary Islands. The islet has an area of 8 hectares and a maximum altitude of 18 metres.

The island is part of a nature reserve and is home to a variety of petrels, Cory's shearwater being one of the dominant species. The climate is dry and there is very little soil.

In 19th-century English literature, the island was called the 'Little Piton'.

See also
List of islands of Portugal

References 

Islands of Portugal
Savage Islands
Extreme points of Portugal
Uninhabited islands of Portugal